Mix 94.5 may refer to one of the following radio stations:

Australia 
6MIX in Perth

United States 
KZMJ 94.5 FM "K-Soul" in Dallas, Texas
WLRW in Champaign, Illinois